Ichin is a rural locality (a selo) in Tsmursky Selsoviet, Suleyman-Stalsky District, Republic of Dagestan, Russia. The population was 333 as of 2010.

Geography 
Ichin is located 15 km west of Kasumkent (the district's administrative centre) by road. Tsnal is the nearest rural locality.

References 

Rural localities in Suleyman-Stalsky District